A redbrick is one of the six civic British universities founded in England that achieved university status before World War I.

Redbrick may also refer to:

 Red brick, a block of ceramic material used in masonry construction
 "Red bricks" are special items in the Lego Star Wars video games
 Red Brick School (disambiguation), multiple schools
 Redbrick (newspaper), the student newspaper of the University of Birmingham
 RedBrick Limited, a game publisher